Methylimidazole may refer to several related chemical compounds:

 1-Methylimidazole
 2-Methylimidazole
 4-Methylimidazole, which is chemically distinct from, but readily interconvertable with 5-methylimidazole